Peter Clohessy (born 22 March 1966) is an Irish former rugby union player, who played for Munster, Queensland Reds and Ireland. He played as a prop and was known by his fans as "The Claw". He played most of his career at tighthead prop but later switched to loosehead.

Munster
Clohessy made his Munster debut against Ulster in 1987. He was part of the Munster team that lost 9-8 to Northampton Saints in the 2000 Heineken Cup Final, and he was again on the losing side when Munster lost 15-9 to Leicester Tigers in the 2002 Final. This was also Clohessy's last game for Munster, as he retired at the end of the 2001–02 season.

Ireland
Clohessy made his Ireland debut against France in February 1993, during the 1993 Five Nations Championship. His first try for Ireland came against Australia in June 1994. Clohessy missed the 1995 World Cup, but was selected in Ireland's squad for the 1999 Tournament. He was desperately unlucky not to be selected for the 1993 British Lions tour to New Zealand and had to withdraw from the 1997 tour to South Africa due to injury . His last appearance for Ireland was against France in the 2002 Six Nations Championship.

Personal life
Clohessy formerly owned a pub in Limerick called 'Clohessy's' and an adjoining night club called 'The Sin Bin'. He opened a pub and restaurant Crokers Bar & Restaurant in Murroe, east Limerick. The menu has a Limerick/rugby theme.

References

External links
Clohessy profile Munster Rugby
Clohessy profile IRFU

Living people
1966 births
Rugby union players from County Limerick
People educated at Crescent College
Irish rugby union players
Young Munster players
Munster Rugby players
Queensland Reds players
Ireland international rugby union players
Rugby union props